Pyrrhulina rachoviana is a small species of tropical fish from the family Lebiasinidae named in honor of the German aquarist Arthur Rachow. The type locality is Rosario, Argentina. A species is sold in the aquarium trade under the name Pyrrhulina rachoviana, but was probably imported from Brazil, not Argentina.

References

Lebiasinidae
Freshwater fish of Argentina
Fishkeeping
Taxa named by George S. Myers
Fish described in 1926